In the summer of 2011, Veigar Páll Gunnarsson transferred from Stabæk to Vålerenga. It was later claimed that Stabæk accepted an offer from Vålerenga for Gunnarsson on 1 million NOK, while Rosenborg offered 5 million for Gunnarsson. At the same time, Vålerenga bought an option for Stabæk's 16-year-old Herman Stengel priced at 4 million. The contracted sum of this transfer was proportional to the sum that AS Nancy would receive, as a result from the contract of the Gunnarsson transfer in 2009, when Gunnarsson transferred between football clubs AS Nancy and Vålerenga — AS Nancy was to receive 50 percent of the transfer fee next time Gunnarsson was transferred to another club.

The clubs Stabæk and Vålerenga were later fined 500,000 and 350,000 Norwegian kroner respectively, by a committee (påtalenemd) of Football Association of Norway. Thereafter a police investigation started.

In the following trial the involved parties were cleared of all charges, and the Norwegian state were forced to pay compensation for wrongful prosecution. Facing legal actions from the acquitted The Norwegian Football Association chose to settle out of court also paying compensations.

Media reports
TV 2 (Norway) revealed on 12 October 2011 that Gunnarsson was transferred to Vålerenga for 1 million NOK, while Vålerenga paid a transfer fee of 4 million NOK for the 15-year-old footballer Herman Stengel. In 2013 Finansavisen said that "In addition the club in Oslo would have to pay Norwegian kroner 12.5 million or 15 million for the player himself, depending on when Vålerenga fetched the 16-year old." Furthermore, the newspaper quoted påtalenemden: "Transfers with such sums are unknown in Norway, with a possible exception for John Carew's transfer from Vålerenga to RBK. - As late as a half year before the option agreement with Vålerenga was signed, Stabæk was evaluating if they 'should use Norwegian kroner 250000 on a 15-year old with a potential for being resold [with a profit] (salgspotensial),' according to a report from the athletic committee of the team from Bærum. Thereafter Stengel is mentioned only once—that he is considering signing on to Stabæk—in the styreprotokoller (recorded notes of the board of directors) and in the referater (recorded notes of meetings) of the athletic commission, according to påtalenemda." Furthermore, "Påtalenemnda finds this 'remarkable'
 since the option agreement in the short term resulted in an infusion (to the economically troubled Stabæk)—four times as much as the Gunnarson transfer, which has been recorded in the notes of the board of directors (styrets protokoll)"

Transfer fees offered by Rosenborg
TV 2 also claimed that Stabæk turned down an offer from Rosenborg on 5 million NOK for Gunnarsson. On 8 November 2011, TV 2 revealed that Rosenborg offered to pay a transfer fee of Norwegian kroner 1 million for Gunnarsson, and 4,25 million for his Swedish teammate Johan Andersson which had six months left of his contract.

Settlement of AS Nancy's compensation claim 
It is alleged that the football transfer was implemented by officials in Stabæk and Vålerenga in order to deprive Nancy of its share of the transfer fee. In October 2011, Nancy asked for a resolution in trying to reclaim €250,000, since Rosenborg BK had put an option for 5 million NOK (€500,000). Nancy settled their civil claim with Stabæk on 17 November 2011.

Nomination of fines by Football Association of Norway
A committee of Football Association of Norway(NFF) — nominated clubs Stabæk and Vålerenga to fines of Norwegian kroner 500 000 and 350 000 respectively, while Erik Loe, Inge André Olsen and Truls Haakonsen were nominated to be banned from holding positions within NFF for a period of 18 months, 18 months and 12 months respectively.

Police investigation
Police started an investigation against clubs Stabæk, Vålerenga and Rosenborg in November 2011, after having interviewed NFF's påtalenemnda. Olsen and Haakonsen were arrested and charged with aggravated breach of trust - grov økonomisk utroskap - on 30 November.
On the same day, The National Authority for Investigation and Prosecution of Economic and Environmental Crime (Økokrim) was securing evidences at both Vålerenga's and Stabæk's offices.

On 16 December 2011, the police also charged Erik Loe, former chairman of Stabæk Fotball, and Lars Holter-Sørensen, chairman of Stabæk AS, with breach of trust.

The police announced on 3 January 2012 that they had charged a fifth person, a lawyer which is a board member of Stabæk Fotball ASA.

Criticism of Stabæk's ranking on the Fair Play table
On 2 December 2011, NFF released the Fair Play table for the 2011 Tippeligaen with Stabæk positioned on a fourth place, behind Tromsø, Molde and Rosenborg. Since the three first teams on the Norwegian Fair Play rank already have qualified for European competition, Stabæk will receive a berth in the first qualifying round of 2012–13 UEFA Europa League if Norway are among the top three nations on UEFA Fair Play ranking which will be released in May 2012.

Roald Bruun-Hansen, the managing director of Brann stated that it does not match his perception of Fair Play when a club investigated for corruption get a Fair Play-berth, and suggested that Sarpsborg 08 gets the Fair Play-berth if Stabæk are convicted. Svein Graff, "informasjonsjef" in NFF, told TV2 that NFF are open to reconsider Stabæks Fair Play-berth, and that there are examples from other European nations where clubs have been excluded from UEFA competition because they have committed administrative criminal violations. The Stabæk-player Mikkel Diskerud stated that Stabæk have become objects of bullying by NFF.

Trial
The trial is scheduled to start on 19 August 2013 with four defendants: Inge André Olsen, Truls Haakonsen, Lars Holter Sørensen (a former chairman of the board of Stabæk Fotball AS) and Tor Qvarfordt Aaserød (a former member of the board of directors Stabæk Fotball AS). The fines (from the police) which have not been accepted will be a part of the trial: Stabæk Fotball (Norwegian kroner 100.000) and Stabæk Fotball AS (200.000).

No one was convicted in the trial.

Reactions to the case
In a 2016 Dagbladet article Håvard Melnæs, the chief editor of Josimar (a football magazine), said that when Josimar started scrutinizing the transfer case in 2015, "we did not know that Jim Solbakken had such a central role. Solbakken said to TV that he did not take a part in the Veigar Páll Gunnarsson transfer to Vålerenga. But the more we investigated, and the more information we got a hold of, the more often Solbakken's name popped up. And during the work with the documentary, it became more and more clear that Jim Solbakken played a central role in the transfer. He acted as agent for Veigar Pall Gunnarson's agent for a while, he was Herman Stengel's agent, he represented Vålerenga in Gunnarsson's transfer from Stabæk, he was Stabæk's agent for a possible future transfer of Stengel, he was a go-between on Stabæk's behalf when they wanted to settle with Nancy, and he represented Nancy when Stabæk wanted to settle with the French club". Furthermore, Melnæs says that "In 2014 we wrote that Solbakken was on both sides of the table during several transfers, something that is a violation of the rules for agents, and documented this".

2016 documentary film
The 2016 documentary film, Frifinnelsen, said that lawyer Erik Flågan in 2011 threatened lawyer Gunnar Martin Kjenner and sport blogger Andreas Selliaas, in connection with the transfer case; in 2016 media said that Flågan does not want to say who he was working for.

Film
On 23 June 2016, a television documentary, Frifinnelsen, was shown on TV2.

References

External links
 Dagbladet.no

2011 in Norwegian football
History of football in Norway
Eliteserien
Association football controversies
Trials in Norway